Southern Boulevard may refer to the following roads in the United States:

Southern Boulevard (Bronx), New York City
Southern Boulevard (Palm Beach County, Florida)
Southern Boulevard Parkway, Philadelphia, Pennsylvania
Southern Boulevard Railroad, Bronx, New York City, chartered in 1885